The Notre Dame–Pittsburgh football rivalry is an American college football rivalry between the Notre Dame Fighting Irish and Pittsburgh Panthers.

History
This storied series began in 1909, and there have been no more than two consecutive seasons without two teams meeting each other except from 1913 to 1929, 1938 to 1942, and 1979 to 1981. Since 1982, the Panthers and Irish have remained a relative fixture on each other's schedules. Notre Dame leads the series 49–21–1.

The series has featured several memorable games.  In 1975, Pittsburgh's Tony Dorsett rushed for a school-record 303 yards in a 34–20 victory at Pitt Stadium, still the most yards ever by an Irish opponent. The following year, he rushed for 181 yards on 22 carries in a 31–10 victory as No. 9 Pitt defeated No. 11 Notre Dame in South Bend, Indiana, en route to an undefeated season and a national championship.

In 2012, Notre Dame's Everett Golson sparked a comeback from 14 points down in the fourth quarter to force overtime, and the Irish survived a narrowly-missed game-winning field goal attempt by the Panthers in the second OT, to pull out a 29–26 victory in triple OT at home to stay unbeaten en route to a perfect 12–0 regular season. The longest game in Notre Dame history occurred between the two schools in 2008, when Pitt defeated ND 36–33 in four overtimes at Notre Dame after the game was delayed briefly in the first overtime by the sprinklers in one end zone suddenly going off. The most recent game was a 45–3 Irish win on October 24, 2020, at Pittsburgh.

The game often gets a large amount of national media attention and most often is televised on major television channels like NBC (which televises all Notre Dame home games), ABC and ESPN.

Game results

See also
 List of NCAA college football rivalry games

Notes

References

College football rivalries in the United States
Notre Dame Fighting Irish football
Pittsburgh Panthers football